Tenaxia is a genus of Asian and African plants in the grass family.

 Species
 Tenaxia aureocephala (J.G.Anderson) N.P.Barker & H.P.Linder - KwaZulu-Natal
 Tenaxia cachemyriana (Jaub. & Spach) N.P.Barker & H.P.Linder - Afghanistan, Tibet, Tajikistan, Jammu and Kashmir, Nepal, Uttarakhand, Himachal Pradesh
 Tenaxia cumminsii (Hook.f.) N.P.Barker & H.P.Linder - Pakistan, Jammu and Kashmir, Nepal, Uttarakhand, Himachal Pradesh
 Tenaxia disticha (Nees) N.P.Barker & H.P.Linder - Zimbabwe, Cape Province, Lesotho, KwaZulu-Natal, Free State
 Tenaxia dura (Stapf) N.P.Barker & H.P.Linder - Cape Province
 Tenaxia guillarmodiae (Conert) N.P.Barker & H.P.Linder - Lesotho, KwaZulu-Natal, Free State
 Tenaxia stricta (Schrad.) N.P.Barker & H.P.Linder - KwaZulu-Natal, Lesotho, Namibia, Cape Province
 Tenaxia subulata (A.Rich.) N.P.Barker & H.P.Linder - Ethiopia, Yemen

See also
 List of Poaceae genera

References

Danthonioideae
Poaceae genera